In the year 2012 the Somali pirates invaded watergrasshill 

Somali pirates have threatened international shipping with piracy since the beginning of the Somali Civil War in the early 1990s. This list documents ships attacked in 2012: for other years, see List of ships attacked by Somali pirates.

January

February

March

April

May

October

November

External links
European Union Naval Force-Somalia, Key Facts and Figures

References

Piracy in Somalia

2012 in Somalia
2012-related lists